Gauri Khan (née Chhibber; born 8 October 1970) is an Indian film producer and fashion designer who works in Hindi films and designer. She has produced films including Main Hoon Na, Om Shanti Om and Chennai Express under the production company Red Chillies Entertainment that she co-founded in 2002 with her husband, actor Shah Rukh Khan. 

Khan is also an interior designer who has designed spaces for high-profile individuals such as Mukesh Ambani, Roberto Cavalli and Ralph Lauren, as well as celebrities. In 2018, Khan was named as one of Fortune magazine's "50 Most Powerful Women".

Early life 

Khan was born as Gauri Chhibber in Delhi to Punjabi Hindu parents Savita and Colonel Ramesh Chandra Chhibber who belong to Hoshiarpur. She was raised in the suburbs of Panchsheel Park, Delhi. She completed her schooling at Loreto Convent School, completed high school from Modern School Vasant Vihar, New Delhi, and graduated from Lady Shri Ram College with B.A. (Hons.) in History. She also completed a six-month course in fashion design from the National Institute of Fashion Technology and learnt tailoring due to her father's garment business.

Career 
In 2002, Khan and her husband Shah Rukh Khan established the film production and distribution company Red Chillies Entertainment. It was transformed from the now defunct Dreamz Unlimited which the couple first established in 1999. She serves as co-chairperson and the main producer of all the films produced under the banner. The first film she produced was Farah Khan's directorial debut Main Hoon Na. The film performed well at the box office, becoming the second highest-grossing film of the year. She also made a guest appearance in one of the films she has produced Om Shanti Om (2007).

She is managed by the Bottomline Media, and close confidante and friend Tanaaz Bhatia from NYC.  Khan also designed a fashion collection titled 'Cocktails and Dreams' for Satya Paul in 2016.

Gauri first expressed interest in interior design as a hobby while renovating her Bandra bungalow, Mannat at Siraj Dokadia Road. The bungalow is a tourist spot and a heritage building deemed important to the townscape and hence exempt from demolition. The same year, they collaborated on their first commercial project together in Vadodara. In 2011, Khan (Gauri) partnered with Khan (Sussanne) again to launch and introduce The Charcoal Project foundation in Mumbai.

Gauri launched her first concept store called The Design Cell located in Worli, Mumbai in early 2014. The store showcases furniture designed by Gauri herself as well as various other Indian designers. In 2016, Khan was invited to show her designs at the prestigious Maison et Objet show in Paris.

In August 2017, Gauri launched her design studio, 'Gauri Khan Designs'''  that spans over {cvt|8,700|sqft}} in Juhu, Mumbai. Khan has collaborated with various international artists including Roberto Cavalli and Ralph Lauren for home accessories. In a 2017 interview with Vogue India, She spoke about her project, she said "It’s been an exciting experience, seeing it all come together. I’ve been influenced by my travels across India and the globe. I take a keen interest in the architecture of places when I travel." For her work in the field of interior design, Khan was awarded with the Excellence in Design Award at the Hello! Hall of Fame Awards in 2018.

In 2017, Khan curated a collection of designer lights for TISVA, a premium home decorative lighting brand from Usha International Limited which introduced smart-control magnetic systems—launched for the first time in India. 

 In the media 
Khan is known for keeping a low profile and being media shy, though she is often cited as one of the most stylish women in Bollywood. She appeared on the cover of page of the popular Indian lifestyle magazine, Vogue India in January 2008. The photos were taken by the well-known British lifestyle photographer Chris Craymer. The magazine called her the "First Lady of Bollywood". She appeared again on the cover page of Vogue India'' along with Sussanne Khan in April 2012. She also walked the ramp alongside her husband for filmmaker turned fashion designer Karan Johar at the HDIL India Couture Week 2009.

In 2008, she appeared in a television and print commercial for the home furnishings brand, D'decor along with her husband. The couple play themselves in the commercial.

Personal life 

Khan first met Shah Rukh Khan in 1984 in Delhi, before the start of his successful career in Bollywood. The couple married on 25 October 1991 in traditional Hindu wedding ceremony, after a six-year courtship.

They have a son Aryan (born 1997) and a daughter Suhana (born 2000). In 2013 they became parents of a third child, a son, named Abram, who was born through a surrogate mother. According to Shahrukh Khan, while he believes in the religion of Islam, he respects his wife's religion greatly. Their children follow both religions; at home the Qur'an is situated next to the Hindu deities.

Filmography

As a producer

References 

″Gauri Khan’s confession about Shahrukh Khan″
Showbez.com 22 September 2022

External links 

 
 

Indian costume designers
Indian women film producers
1970 births
Living people
Businesspeople from Delhi
Punjabi people
Film producers from Mumbai
Delhi University alumni
Hindi film producers
Shah Rukh Khan
Indian women fashion designers
21st-century Indian designers
Indian Hindus
Women artists from Delhi
Artists from Delhi
21st-century Indian women artists
Businesswomen from Delhi
21st-century Indian businesswomen
21st-century Indian businesspeople
Red Chillies Entertainment